Fimbristylis vahlii is a species of sedge known by the common name Vahl's fimbry. It is native to much of Central America and the southern half of North America, where it grows in wet habitat. This is a small, clumping sedge producing rounded stems just a few centimeters high surrounded by curling, thready leaves. At the top of the stem is an inflorescence which is a cluster of several cylindrical, pointed spikelets surrounded by long, narrow, twisting bracts. The fruit is a tiny achene about half a millimeter wide.

External links
Jepson Manual Treatment
USDA Plants Profile
Photo gallery

References 

vahlii
Plants described in 1791